The Barber of Stamford Hill is a 1962 British drama film directed by Casper Wrede from a screenplay adapted by Ronald Harwood from his own 1960 television play of the same name,  made at Shepperton Studios. Actor John Bennett (then aged thirty-four) plays Mr. Figg, a Jewish barber about to turn fifty, as he contemplates middle age and expresses regrets at never having started a family.

Plot
The film opens in Mr. Figg’s barbershop in Stamford Hill, in which he discusses his family life with his customers. Upon his arrival home, however, it is revealed that he is a bachelor and his stories of family life are inventions he concocts because he believes they are what his customers want to hear. In fact, he lives on his own in a flat in Stepney and on Friday nights lights the Shabbat candles before his mute friend Dober comes to visit and they spend the evening eating and playing chess.

As he sits with Dober, Mr. Figg discusses his sadness at not having had a family and subsequently decides to propose to Mrs. Werner, a widowed neighbour with two children, so, leaving Dober in the flat, visits her in the hope of doing so. However, as he sits in her kitchen he is not only surprised by her admitting she does not follow Jewish tradition by lighting the candles but is unsure how to respond to domestic conflicts that take place between Mrs. Werner and her children, as her son noisily plays the drums in the front room and her daughter argues with her about being allowed to go out. Before he can get round to proposing, Mrs. Werner mentions that she recently received an offer of marriage from the local butcher only to laugh the idea off as preposterous, leading Mr. Figg to abandon his plan and return to his flat.

The film ends with Mr. Figg back in his barbershop, chatting to a customer and relating the story of Mrs Werner’s son playing the drums as if it is a story about his own, fictional, family.

Cast
 Mr. Figg… John Bennett
 Mrs. Werner… Megs Jenkins
 Dober… Maxwell Shaw
 Mr. O… Wensley Pithey
 Lister… John Graham
 Willy… Trevor Peacock
 1st Customer… Eric Thompson
 2nd Customer… Barry Keegan
 Marilyn… Judi Bloom
 Lennie…David Franks

Trivia
Originally a TV play made for ITV Television Playhouse in 1960, (series 5, episode 47, with Danny Green, as Mr. O.  The film version was also directed by Caspar Wrede and written by Ronald Harwood, though the only actor to appear in both was Maxwell Shaw as Dober.

External links
 https://player.bfi.org.uk/free/film/watch-the-barber-of-stamford-hill-1962-online
 https://www2.bfi.org.uk/films-tv-people/4ce2b6a4a0180

References

1962 films
British drama films
1962 drama films
1960s English-language films
Films based on television plays
1960s British films